Diocese of Toronto may refer to:

Anglican Diocese of Toronto
Roman Catholic Archdiocese of Toronto